Orinsay is a crofting village on the Isle of Lewis in the district of Pairc, in the Outer Hebrides, Scotland. The settlement is within the parish of Lochs. It is the birthplace of folk singer Calum Kennedy.

References 

Villages in the Isle of Lewis